The Luxembourg Space Agency (LSA) is the national space agency of the Grand Duchy of Luxembourg. It was founded on September 12, 2018, by Luxembourg's Economy Minister Étienne Schneider.

Goal 
The goal of the Luxembourg Space Agency is to use Luxembourg's state funds to provide private companies, start-ups and organizations in the field of space exploration with financial support, especially those working on asteroid mining.

See also 
 Space colonization
 Space law

References

External links 
 

2018 establishments
Science and technology in Luxembourg
Space program of Luxembourg
Government agencies of Luxembourg
Space agencies